Alba is a magazine founded in Paris in August 2008. It explores the relationships between the Hispanic culture and other important cultures or cities. The magazine is bilingual Spanish-Chinese in Pekin, Spanish-French in Paris, and its articles always link two cultures and tend to be short. Regarding the short-story and poetry, one of its objectives is to promote new translations. Alba was the first to publish the Chinese poet Hai Zi in Spanish; Raul Gomez Jattin in French and Luisa Futoransky in Chinese, and so on. Alba is present in seven cities; Londres, Paris, Pekin, Berlin, Cochabamba, Buenos Aires and Wanati.
Besides Paris and Pekin, the magazine is distributed in the main Latin-American capitals.

External links
 Alba London
 Alba Berlin
 About Alba

2008 establishments in France
Cultural magazines
French-language magazines
Magazines established in 2008
Magazines published in Paris
Multilingual magazines